Elof Fritjof Valentin Hillén (19 May 1893 – 7 November 1977) was a Swedish footballer who played as a defender for GAIS and the Sweden national team. He competed in the 1924 Summer Olympics as a member of the Swedish team which won the bronze medal in the football tournament.

References

1893 births
1977 deaths
Association football defenders
Swedish footballers
GAIS players
Footballers at the 1920 Summer Olympics
Footballers at the 1924 Summer Olympics
Olympic footballers of Sweden
Olympic bronze medalists for Sweden
Sweden international footballers
Olympic medalists in football
Medalists at the 1924 Summer Olympics
Footballers from Gothenburg